The National Fund for Scientific Research (NFSR) (Dutch: Nationaal Fonds voor Wetenschappelijk Onderzoek (NFWO), French: Fonds National de la Recherche Scientifique (FNRS)) was once a government institution in Belgium for supporting scientific research until it was split into two separate organizations:
 the Dutch-speaking Fonds Wetenschappelijk Onderzoek – Vlaanderen (FWO) (Research Foundation – Flanders) for the Flemish Community
and
 the French-speaking Fonds de la Recherche Scientifique – FNRS (F.R.S.–FNRS) for the French Community.

The task of the FWO and F.R.S.–FNRS is to stimulate the development of new knowledge in all scientific disciplines. The means to achieve this, is to finance excellent scientists and research projects after an inter-University competition and with an evaluation by foreign experts. The criterion for support is the scientific quality of the scientist and the research proposal, irrespective of scientific discipline.

Both institutions, the FWO and the F.R.S.–FNRS, are located in the same building at Egmontstraat 5 rue d'Egmont in B-1000 Brussels.

History
The National Fund for Scientific Research (NFSR) was founded on 2 June 1928 after a call by king Albert I of Belgium for more resources for scientific research. On 1 October 1927, in a speech at Cockerill in Seraing, King Albert I strongly emphasized the importance of scientific research to the economic development of Belgium. He repeated his appeal for more resources, on 26 November 1927, in a speech to the Academy. This led to the creation within the University Foundation of the National Fund for Scientific Research on 2 June 1928. The new institute was led by Emile Francqui.

Financial support initially came from the public, and from the Solvay family that gave 100 million Belgian francs. Financial contributions from the state were not needed until 1947. Today, part of the funding still comes from non-governmental sources, such as from the charitable television station Télévie.

The NFSR was the first Belgian organization to finance fundamental scientific research. Among the earliest projects funded were the stratosphere flights of professor Auguste Piccard. The FNRS-1 was a balloon that set a world altitude record. The NFSR also funded the FNRS-2, which was the first ever bathyscaphe built.

Some early funded projects
 Archaeology
 Series of excavations at Apamea in Syria (1930-)
 Excavations on Easter Island in (1934–1935)
 Geography
 Expedition to Rwenzori (1932)
 Physics
 Stratospheric aerostat (1930) and bathyscaphe (1947) of Auguste Piccard
 Participation at the Jungfraujoch observatory
 An observatory for Earth's magnetic field at Manhay and Lubumbashi (1932)

See also
 Belgian Federal Science Policy Office
 Science and technology in Belgium
 Science and technology in the Brussels-Capital Region
 Science and technology in Flanders
 Science and technology in Wallonia
 Belgian Interdisciplinary Platform for Industrial Biotechnology
 Institute for the promotion of Innovation by Science and Technology
 Belgian Academy Council of Applied Sciences
 Belgian Society of Biochemistry and Molecular Biology
 Belgian Physical Society
 Flanders Interuniversity Institute of Biotechnology
 Flemish institute for technological research
 Francqui Foundation
 Francqui Prize
 InBev-Baillet Latour Fund
 Queen Elisabeth Medical Foundation

External links
 Fonds de la Recherche Scientifique – FNRS – official website (in French)
 Beyond Academic Science: Hoover and Francqui’s Legacy in Post-War Belgium (MS Word)

Scientific organisations based in Belgium
Science and technology in Belgium
Foundations based in Belgium
Members of the European Research Consortium for Informatics and Mathematics